ERPs may refer to:

 ERPS, Ethernet Ring Protection Switching
 Erps-Kwerps, village in the Belgian Province of Flemish Brabant

See also 
 ERP (disambiguation)